William Griffith Wilson (November 26, 1895 – January 24, 1971), also known as Bill Wilson or Bill W., was the co-founder of  Alcoholics Anonymous (AA).

AA is an international  mutual aid fellowship with about two million members worldwide belonging to AA groups, associations, organizations, cooperatives, and fellowships of alcoholics helping other alcoholics achieve and maintain sobriety.  Following  AA's Twelfth Tradition of anonymity, Wilson is commonly known as "Bill W." or "Bill". In order to identify each other, members of AA will sometimes ask others if they are "friends of Bill". Although this question can be confusing, because "Bill" is a common name, it does provide a means of establishing the common experience of AA membership. After Wilson's death in 1971, and amidst much controversy within the fellowship, his full name was included in obituaries by journalists who were unaware of the significance of maintaining anonymity within the organization.

Wilson's sobriety from alcohol, which he maintained until his death, began December 11, 1934. In 1955 Wilson turned over control of AA to a board of trustees. Wilson died in 1971 of emphysema complicated by pneumonia from smoking tobacco. In 1999 Time listed him as "Bill W.: The Healer" in the Time 100: The Most Important People of the Century.

Early life

Wilson was born on November 26, 1895, in East Dorset, Vermont, the son of Emily (née Griffith) and Gilman Barrows Wilson. He was born at his parents' home and business, the Mount Aeolus Inn and Tavern. His paternal grandfather, William C. Wilson, was also an alcoholic. Influenced by the preaching of an itinerant evangelist, some weeks before, William C. Wilson climbed to the top of Mt. Aeolus and had a spiritual experience and never drank alcohol again.

Both of Bill's parents abandoned him soon after he and his sister were bornhis father never returned from a purported business trip, and his mother left Vermont to study osteopathic medicine. Bill and his sister were raised by their maternal grandparents, Fayette and Ella Griffith. As a teen, Bill showed little interest in his academic studies and was rebellious. During a summer break in high school, he spent months designing and carving a boomerang to throw at birds, raccoons, and other local wildlife. After many difficult years during his early-mid teens, Bill became the captain of his high school's football team, and the principal violinist in its orchestra. Bill also dealt with a serious bout of depression at the age of seventeen, following the death of his first love, Bertha Bamford, who died of complications from surgery.

Marriage, work, and alcoholism

Wilson met his wife Lois Burnham during the summer of 1913, while sailing on Vermont's Emerald Lake; two years later the couple became engaged. He entered Norwich University, but depression and panic attacks forced him to leave during his second semester. The next year he returned, but was soon suspended with a group of students involved in a hazing incident. Because no one would take responsibility, and no one would identify the perpetrators, the entire class was punished.

The June 1916 incursion into the U.S. by Pancho Villa resulted in Wilson's class being mobilized as part of the Vermont National Guard and he was reinstated to serve.  The following year he was commissioned as an artillery officer. During military training in Massachusetts, the young officers were often invited to dinner by the locals, and Wilson had his first drink, a glass of beer, to little effect. A few weeks later at another dinner party, Wilson drank some Bronx cocktails, and felt at ease with the guests and liberated from his awkward shyness; "I had found the elixir of life", he wrote. "Even that first evening I got thoroughly drunk, and within the next time or two I passed out completely. But as everyone drank hard, not too much was made of that."

Wilson married Lois on January 24, 1918, just before he left to serve in World War I as a 2nd lieutenant in the Coast Artillery. After his military service, Wilson returned to live with his wife in New York. He failed to graduate from law school because he was too drunk to pick up his diploma. Wilson became a stock speculator and had success traveling the country with his wife, evaluating companies for potential investors. During these trips Lois had a hidden agenda: she hoped the travel would keep Wilson from drinking. However, Wilson's constant drinking made business impossible and ruined his reputation.

In 1933 Wilson was committed to the Charles B. Towns Hospital for Drug and Alcohol Addictions in New York City four times under the care of William Duncan Silkworth. Silkworth's theory was that alcoholism was a matter of both physical and mental control:  a craving, the manifestation of a physical allergy (the physical inability to stop drinking once started) and an obsession of the mind (to take the first drink). Wilson gained hope from Silkworth's assertion that alcoholism was a medical condition, but even that knowledge could not help him. He was eventually told that he would either die from his alcoholism or have to be locked up permanently due to Wernicke encephalopathy (commonly referred to as "wet brain").

A spiritual program for recovery
In November 1934, Wilson was visited by old drinking companion Ebby Thacher. Wilson was astounded to find that Thacher had been sober for several weeks under the guidance of the evangelical Christian Oxford Group. Wilson took some interest in the group, but shortly after Thacher's visit, he was again admitted to Towns Hospital to recover from a bout of drinking. This was his fourth and last stay at Towns Hospital under Silkworth's care and he showed signs of delirium tremens. There, Bill W had a "White Light" spiritual experience and quit drinking. Earlier that evening, Thacher had visited and tried to persuade him to turn himself over to the care of a Christian deity who would liberate him from alcohol. According to Wilson, while lying in bed depressed and despairing, he cried out, "I'll do anything! Anything at all! If there be a God, let Him show Himself!" He then had the sensation of a bright light, a feeling of ecstasy, and a new serenity. He never drank again for the remainder of his life. Wilson described his experience to Silkworth, who told him, "Something has happened to you I don't understand.  But you had better hang on to it".

Wilson joined the Oxford Group and tried to help other alcoholics, but succeeded only in keeping sober himself. During a failed business trip to Akron, Ohio, Wilson was tempted to drink again and decided that to remain sober he needed to help another alcoholic. He called phone numbers in a church directory and eventually secured an introduction to Bob Smith, an alcoholic Oxford Group member. Wilson explained Silkworth's theory that alcoholics suffer from a physical allergy and a mental obsession. Wilson shared that the only way he was able to stay sober was through having had a spiritual experience. Smith was familiar with the tenets of the Oxford Group and upon hearing Wilson's experience, "began to pursue the spiritual remedy for his malady with a willingness that he had never before been able to muster.  After a brief relapse, he sobered, never to drink again up to the moment of his death in 1950". Wilson and Smith began working with other alcoholics. After that summer in Akron, Wilson returned to New York where he began having success helping alcoholics in what they called "a nameless squad of drunks" in an Oxford Group there.

In 1938, after about 100 alcoholics in Akron and New York had become sober, the fellowship decided to promote its program of recovery through the publication of a book, for which Wilson was chosen as primary author. The book was given the title Alcoholics Anonymous and included the list of suggested activities for spiritual growth known as the Twelve Steps. The movement itself took on the name of the book. Bill incorporated the principles of nine of the Twelve Traditions, (a set of spiritual guidelines to ensure the survival of individual AA groups) in his foreword to the original edition; later, Traditions One, Two, and Ten were clearly specified when all twelve statements were published. The AA general service conference of 1955 was a landmark event for Wilson in which he turned over the leadership of the maturing organization to an elected board.

In 1939, Wilson and Marty Mann visited High Watch Farm in Kent, CT. They would go on to find what is now High Watch Recovery Center, the world's first alcohol and addiction recovery center founded on Twelve Step principles.

Political beliefs

Wilson strongly advocated that AA groups have not the "slightest reform or political complexion". In 1946, he wrote "No AA group or members should ever, in such a way as to implicate AA, express any opinion on outside controversial issues – particularly those of politics, alcohol reform or sectarian religion. The Alcoholics Anonymous groups oppose no one. Concerning such matters they can express no views whatever." Reworded, this became "Tradition 10" for AA.

The final years

During the last years of his life, Wilson rarely attended AA meetings to avoid being asked to speak as the co-founder rather than as an alcoholic. A heavy smoker, Wilson eventually suffered from emphysema and later pneumonia. He continued to smoke while dependent on an oxygen tank in the late 1960s.  While notes written by nurse James Dannenberg say that Bill Wilson asked for whiskey four times (December 25, 1970, January 2, 1971, January 8, 1971, and January 14, 1971) in his final month of living, he drank no alcohol for the final 36 years of his life.

Alleged marital infidelity
Francis  Hartigan, biographer of Bill Wilson and personal secretary to Lois Wilson in her later years, wrote that in the mid-1950s Bill began a fifteen-year affair with Helen Wynn, a woman 18 years his junior that he met through AA. Hartigan also asserts that this relationship was preceded by other marital infidelities. Wilson arranged in 1963 to leave 10 percent of his book royalties to Helen Wynn and the rest to his wife Lois.

Historian Ernest Kurtz was skeptical of the veracity of the reports of Wilson's womanizing.  He judged that the reports were traceable to a single person, Tom Powers, a formerly close friend of Wilson's with whom he had a falling-out in the mid-1950s.

Archives at Stepping Stones

Personal letters between Wilson and Lois spanning a period of more than 60 years are kept in the archives at Stepping Stones, their former home in Katonah, New York, and in AA's General Service Office archives in New York.

Alternative cures and spiritualism
In the 1950s, Wilson used LSD in medically supervised experiments with Betty Eisner, Gerald Heard, and Aldous Huxley, taking LSD for the first time on August 29, 1956. With Wilson's invitation, his wife Lois, his spiritual adviser Father Ed Dowling, and Nell Wing also participated in experimentation of this drug. Later Wilson wrote to Carl Jung, praising the results and recommending it as validation of Jung's spiritual experience. (The letter was not in fact sent as Jung had died.) According to Wilson, the session allowed him to re-experience a spontaneous spiritual experience he had had years before, which had enabled him to overcome his own alcoholism.

Bill was enthusiastic about his experience; he felt it helped him eliminate many barriers erected by the self, or ego, that stand in the way of one's direct experience of the cosmos and of God. He thought he might have found something that could make a big difference to the lives of many who still suffered. Bill is quoted as saying: "It is a generally acknowledged fact in spiritual development that ego reduction makes the influx of God's grace possible. If, therefore, under LSD   we can have a temporary reduction, so that we can better see what we are and where we are goingwell, that might be of some help. The goal might become clearer. So I consider LSD to be of some value to some people, and practically no damage to anyone. It will never take the place of any of the existing means by which we can reduce the ego, and keep it reduced." Wilson felt that regular usage of LSD in a carefully controlled, structured setting would be beneficial for many recovering alcoholics. However, he felt this method only should be attempted by individuals with well-developed super-egos.

In 1957, Wilson wrote a letter to Heard saying: "I am certain that the LSD experiment has helped me very much. I find myself with a heightened colour perception and an appreciation of beauty almost destroyed by my years of depressions." Most AAs were strongly opposed to his experimenting with a mind-altering substance.

Wilson met Abram Hoffer and learned about the potential mood-stabilizing effects of niacin. Wilson was impressed with experiments indicating that alcoholics who were given niacin had a better sobriety rate, and he began to see niacin "as completing the third leg in the stool, the physical to complement the spiritual and emotional". Wilson also believed that niacin had given him relief from depression, and he promoted the vitamin within the AA community and with the National Institute of Mental Health as a treatment for schizophrenia. However, Wilson created a major furor in AA because he used the AA office and letterhead in his promotion.

For Wilson, spiritualism was a lifelong interest. One of his letters to adviser Father Dowling suggests that while Wilson was working on his book Twelve Steps and Twelve Traditions, he felt that spirits were helping him, in particular a 15th-century monk named Boniface.  Despite his conviction that he had evidence for the reality of the spirit world, Wilson chose not to share this with AA. However, his practices still created controversy within the AA membership. Wilson and his wife continued with their unusual practices in spite of the misgivings of many AA members. In their house they had a "spook room" where they would invite guests to participate in seances using a Ouija board.

Legacy
In 2001, Alcoholics Anonymous reported having  over 120,000 registered local groups and over two million active members worldwide.

Wilson has often been described as having loved being the center of attention, but after the AA principle of anonymity had become established, he refused an honorary degree from Yale University and refused to allow his picture, even from the back, on the cover of Time. Wilson's persistence, his ability to take and use good ideas, and his entrepreneurial flair are revealed in his pioneering escape from an alcoholic "death sentence", his central role in the development of a program of spiritual growth, and his leadership in creating and building AA, "an independent, entrepreneurial, maddeningly democratic, non-profit organization".

Wilson is perhaps best known as a synthesizer of ideas, the man who pulled together various threads of psychology, theology, and democracy into a workable and life-saving system. Aldous Huxley called him "the greatest social architect of our century", and Time magazine named Wilson to their "Time 100 List of The Most Important People of the 20th Century". Wilson's self-description was a man who, "because of his bitter experience, discovered, slowly and through a conversion experience, a system of behavior and a series of actions that work for alcoholics who want to stop drinking."

Biographer Susan Cheever wrote in My Name Is Bill, "Bill Wilson never held himself up as a model: he only hoped to help other people by sharing his own experience, strength and hope. He insisted again and again that he was just an ordinary man".

Wilson bought a house that he and Lois called Stepping Stones on an  estate in Katonah, New York, in 1941, and he lived there with Lois until he died in 1971. After Lois died in 1988, the house was opened for tours and is now on the National Register of Historic Places; it was designated a National Historic Landmark in 2012.

In popular culture
Over the years, Bill W., the formation of AA and also his wife Lois have been the subject of numerous projects, starting with My Name Is Bill W., a 1989 CBS Hallmark Hall of Fame TV movie starring James Woods as Bill W. and James Garner as Bob Smith. Woods won an Emmy for his portrayal of Wilson. He was also depicted in a 2010 TV movie based on Lois' life, When Love Is Not Enough: The Lois Wilson Story, adapted from a 2005 book of the same name written by William G. Borchert. The film starred Winona Ryder as Lois Wilson and Barry Pepper as Bill W.

A 2012 documentary, Bill W., was directed by Dan Carracino and Kevin Hanlon.

The band El Ten Eleven's song "Thanks Bill" is dedicated to Bill W. since lead singer Kristian Dunn's wife got sober due to AA. He states "If she hadn't gotten sober we probably wouldn't be together, so that's my thank you to Bill Wilson who invented AA".

In Michael Graubart's Sober Songs Vol. 1, the song "Hey, Hey, AA" references Bill's encounter with Ebby Thatcher which started him on the path to recovery and eventually the creation of Alcoholics Anonymous. The lyric reads, "Ebby T. comes strolling in.  Bill says, 'Fine, you're a friend of mine.  Don't mind if I drink my gin.

See also
 Addiction
 Jim Burwell
 History of Alcoholics Anonymous
 Lucille Kahn
 Rowland Hazard III ("Rowland H")
 Stepping Stones – Historic Home of Bill & Lois Wilson
 Twelve-step program
 Bill W. and Dr. Bob (theatrical play)
 Bob Smith (Dr. Bob), the other co-founder of AA

Notes

References

Sources and further reading
 
  
  ('Big Book')

External links

1895 births
1971 deaths
Alcoholics Anonymous
Deaths from emphysema
People from Dorset, Vermont
Vermont National Guard personnel
Norwich University alumni
Psychedelic drug researchers
Alcohol abuse counselors
American psychedelic drug advocates
Burials in Vermont
People from Katonah, New York
People from Bedford Hills, New York
United States Army personnel of World War I
United States Army officers